"Dreamin' of You" is a song by Bob Dylan recorded in January 1997 during the sessions for Time Out of Mind but not released until 2008. In that year, the song was featured on Dylan's The Bootleg Series Vol. 8 – Tell Tale Signs collection, and released as a single. (Prior to its official release members of the Bob Dylan community could download the song for free.)

A promotional music video, which starred Harry Dean Stanton, premiered on Amazon.

A 7" vinyl single release of the song (in radio edit form) was available as a bonus with advance orders of the deluxe edition of Tell Tale Signs from Dylan's website. This release featured an alternative version of "Ring Them Bells" as the B-side.

External links 
Lyrics - lyrics on Bob Dylan's official website

Songs written by Bob Dylan
Bob Dylan songs
1997 songs
2008 singles
Columbia Records singles
Song recordings produced by Daniel Lanois